The Ceremony of Innocence is a 1970 television movie adaptation of the play by the same name which depicts a highly fictionalized account of the events leading up to Sweyn Forkbeard's invasion of England in AD 1013.

The script was written by Ronald Ribman and the film was directed by Ken Rockefeller and Arthur Allan Seidelman.

Cast
(as listed in the program)
James Broderick as Sussex
Larry Gates as Kent
Robert Gerringer as Bishop Aelfhun
Ernest Graves as King Sweyn
Howard Green as Thorkill
John Horn as Prince Edmund
Elizabeth Hubbard as Queen Emma
Richard Kiley as King Ethelred
Jessie Royce Landis as Queen Alfreda
Michael Lombard as Abbot
Gilmer McCormick as Thulja

See also
 List of historical drama films

External links
 

Films set in the 11th century
1970 films
Films set in England
Films set in the Viking Age
American films based on actual events
1970s English-language films